Chris Carrozzi (born March 2, 1990) is a Canadian former professional ice hockey goaltender. He last played for English club Guildford Flames of the UK EIHL. Carrozzi was originally selected by the Atlanta Thrashers in the sixth round (154th overall) of the 2008 NHL Entry Draft while playing major junior hockey with the Mississauga St. Michael's Majors in the Ontario Hockey League (OHL). He grew up in Barrhaven, near Foxfield.

Career statistics

Awards and honours

References

External links

1990 births
Living people
Asiago Hockey 1935 players
Atlanta Thrashers draft picks
Canadian ice hockey goaltenders
Canadian sportspeople of Italian descent
Chicago Wolves players
Colorado Eagles players
Guildford Flames players
Gwinnett Gladiators players
Ice hockey people from Ottawa
Idaho Steelheads (ECHL) players
Mississauga St. Michael's Majors players
Ontario Reign (ECHL) players
Rødovre Mighty Bulls players
St. John's IceCaps players
Toronto St. Michael's Majors players